Walter Patrick McConaughy, Jr. (September 11, 1908 – November 10, 2000) was a career American diplomat who served as U.S. Ambassador to a number of countries.

Education
McConaughy attended Birmingham–Southern College and Duke University, graduating in 1930.

Career
McConaughy joined the US State Department after graduation. He first served in Tampico, Mexico and then in 1933 was posted to Kobe, Japan, where he served for seven years with brief spells in Taiwan and Nagasaki.  He was transferred to Peiping in 1941. When the Pacific War commenced he was interned and then repatriated. He then served in La Paz, Bolivia as a commercial attache, and then Rio de Janeiro.

In 1948, was posted to as Consul at the United States Consulate General in Shanghai and was promoted to Consul General in 1949. Following the communist victory in China, he closed the Shanghai Consulate and moved to Hong Kong.  McConaughy's reports from that period show a burning clarity in their analysis of Chinese Communist propaganda and the currents of information available in Hong Kong.

After returning to Washington to serve alongside Edwin M. Martin and O.E. Clubb in the Office of Chinese Affairs, he served as the ambassador to Burma from May 1957 to November 1959. He then accepted an offer to become the ambassador to South Korea, a post he held from 1959 to 1961, later becoming the ambassador to Pakistan from 1962 to 1966 and the ambassador to the Republic of China from 1966 to 1974. 

His obituary appeared in The New York Times.

References

1908 births
2000 deaths
Ambassadors of the United States to Taiwan
Ambassadors of the United States to Pakistan
Ambassadors of the United States to Myanmar
Ambassadors of the United States to South Korea
Duke University alumni
Consuls general of the United States in Shanghai
Consuls general of the United States in Hong Kong and Macau
United States Foreign Service personnel